Otto Siegel (May 7, 1897 – August 21, 1962) was an American set decorator. He was nominated for an Academy Award in the category Best Art Direction for the film Cimarron.

Selected filmography
 Cimarron (1960)

References

External links

American set decorators
1897 births
1962 deaths